Lake Markakol (Marqaköl; , ozero Markakol') is a lake and popular tourist destination in East Kazakhstan. The lake is fed with small rivers and streams. Its coasts are cut up by gulfs. It is the largest lake in the Katonkaragay District of East Kazakhstan Region. Its main outflow is the Kalzhyr, a tributary of the Irtysh. There have been more than 700 species of higher plants recorded in this area.

Gallery

References

Lakes of Kazakhstan
Altai Mountains
East Kazakhstan Region
LMarkakol
South Siberian Mountains